The Taifa of Tortosa was a medieval Islamic taifa kingdom. It existed for two separate periods, from 1010 to 1060 and 1081 to 1099. It was founded by the Slavic warlord Labib al-Fata al-Saqlabi.

List of Emirs

Saqlabi (Servile Rulers) dynasty
Labib al-Fata al-Saqlabi (Valencia 1017–1019): c. 1009–bfr. 1039/40
 Muqatil Sayf al-Milla: bfr. 1039/40–1053/4
 Ya'la: 1053/4–1057/8
 Nabil: 1057/8–1060
 To Zaragoza: 1060–1081 or 2/3

Huddid dynasty
 al-Mundir 'Imad ad-Dawla: 1081 or 1082/3–1090
 Sulayman Sayyid: 1090–c.1115
 To Morocco: c.1115–1148

See also
 List of Sunni Muslim dynasties

 
1099 disestablishments
States and territories established in 1010
Tortosa